Devontae Booker (born May 27, 1992) is an American football running back who is a free agent. He played college football at the University of Utah. He was drafted by the Denver Broncos in the fourth round of the 2016 NFL Draft.

Early years
Booker attended and played high school football for Grant Union High School in Sacramento, California, where he rushed for 2,884 yards and 45 touchdowns as a senior. He helped Grant High to the 2008 CIF State Open Division state title as a junior, leading the team in rushing yards (1,850) and touchdowns (36). Booker was named to the Sacramento Bee's all-metro teams in 2008 and 2009.

College career

American River College
Booker attended American River College from 2011 to 2013. In 2011, he had 793 rushing yards and 12 touchdowns and in 2012, he had 1,472 yards and 15 touchdowns. He was originally expected to transfer to the University of Utah prior to the 2013 season, but was unable due to academic reasons. He stayed at American River College and did not play football in 2013.

Utah
Booker officially transferred to Utah in 2014. He entered the season splitting time with Bubba Poole, but eventually became the main running back. Booker started 9-of-13 games his junior season, finishing with 292 carries for 1,512 yards (5.2 avg.) with 10 touchdowns in addition to 43 catches for 306 yards with two touchdowns. He posted the second-most yards (1,512) and third-most carries (292) in school history, earning a first-team All-Pac-12 selection. Booker opened the first 10 games of 2015 before suffering a season-ending knee injury, finishing with 1,261 yards on 268 carries (4.7 avg.) with 11 touchdowns in addition to catching 37 passes for 318 yards. He led the nation with 305 touches from scrimmage (30.5 per game) and carries per game (26.8) at the time of his knee injury. Booker was named a Maxwell Award semifinalist (national player of the year) and Doak Walker Award semifinalist (nation's top running back) in addition to earning All-Pac-12 second-team honor. Booker started 19-of-23 games played at the University of Utah.

College statistics

Professional career

Denver Broncos

2016 season
Booker was drafted by the Denver Broncos in the fourth round with the 136th overall pick in the 2016 NFL Draft. He was the seventh running back to be selected that year. Booker opened training camp competing for a roster spot as a reserve player behind veteran starter C. J. Anderson.  At the conclusion of the preseason, he was named the season as the No. 2 running back behind Anderson. On his first NFL carry against the Carolina Panthers, Booker fumbled the ball and was recovered by former Grant High School teammate Shaq Thompson. Booker re-entered the game, and finished with three carries for eight yards. Booker had his first career touchdown against the Houston Texans on October 24 after Anderson left the game with an injury. After Anderson was lost for the season, Booker became the starting running back the following week against the Chargers. He was the starter for the Broncos the next five games until the Broncos claimed Justin Forsett off waivers, who started the final three games. Booker finished his rookie year playing in all 16 games with six starts, rushing 174 times for 612 yards and four touchdowns along with 31 receptions for 265 yards and one touchdown. Booker became the 13th rookie in team history and first since Knowshon Moreno in 2009 to lead the team in rushing.

2017 season
Booker remained in the Broncos' backfield in the 2017 season. He appeared in 13 games with no starts, rushing 79 times for 299 yards (3.8 avg.) with one touchdown and catching 30 passes for 275 yards. He added 14 kickoff returns for 276 yards and a 19.7 average.

2018 season
After the departure of C. J. Anderson, Booker competed for the starting running back gig with third-round rookie Royce Freeman.  Booker was named the second running back behind Freeman at the end of the 2018 preseason.  He rushed for 183 yards and one rushing touchdown in the 2018 season while appearing in all 16 games with no starts. In addition, he had 38 receptions for 275 receiving yards.

2019 season
Booker began the season as the third running back on the depth chart, behind second-year players Royce Freeman and Phillip Lindsay.  He appeared in 15 games, with no starts, and recorded six receptions for 57 receiving yards to go along with two carries for nine rushing yards in the 2019 season.

Las Vegas Raiders
On May 11, 2020, Booker signed a one-year, veteran's minimum deal with the Las Vegas Raiders. He was placed on the reserve/COVID-19 list by the team on July 30, 2020, and activated from the list five days later. He scored his first rushing touchdown as a Raider against the Los Angeles Chargers in a 31–26 victory in Week 9. In Week 10 against his former team, the Denver Broncos, Booker rushed for 81 yards and two touchdowns during the 37–12 win. He finished the 2020 season with 93 carries for 423 rushing yards and three rushing touchdowns to go along with 17 receptions for 84 receiving yards.

New York Giants
On March 19, 2021, Booker signed a two-year contract with the New York Giants. He scored his first rushing touchdown as a Giant against the Dallas Cowboys in a 44-20 loss in Week 5. In Week 9, against the Las Vegas Raiders, he had 122 scrimmage yards in the 23–16 victory. Booker finished the 2021 season with 145 carries for 593 rushing yards and two rushing touchdowns to go along with 40 receptions for 268 receiving yards and one receiving touchdown. He was released on March 3, 2022.

NFL career statistics

Personal life
Booker received a bachelor's degree in sociology in December 2015.

References

External links

 Utah Utes bio

1992 births
Living people
Players of American football from Sacramento, California
American football running backs
American River Beavers football players
Utah Utes football players
Denver Broncos players
Las Vegas Raiders players
New York Giants players